A lye is an alkali metal hydroxide traditionally obtained by leaching wood ashes, or a strong alkali which is highly soluble in water producing caustic basic solutions. "Lye" most commonly refers to sodium hydroxide (NaOH), but historically has been used for potassium hydroxide (KOH).

Today, lye is commercially manufactured using a membrane cell chloralkali process. It is supplied in various forms such as flakes, pellets, microbeads, coarse powder or a solution. Lye has traditionally been used as a major ingredient in soapmaking.

Etymology
The English word   has cognates in all Germanic languages, and originally designated a bath or hot spring.

Uses

Food 
Lyes are used to cure many types of food, including the traditional Nordic lutefisk, olives (making them less bitter), canned mandarin oranges, hominy, lye rolls, century eggs, pretzels, and bagels. They are also used as a tenderizer in the crust of baked Cantonese moon cakes, in "zongzi" (glutinous rice dumplings wrapped in bamboo leaves), in chewy southern Chinese noodles popular in Hong Kong and southern China, and in Japanese ramen noodles. They are also used in kutsinta, a type of rice cake from the Philippines together with pitsi-pitsî. In Assam, north east India, extensive use is made of a type of lye called khar in Assamese and karwi in Boro which is obtained by filtering the ashes of various banana stems, roots and skin in their cooking and also for curing, as medicine and as a substitute for soap. Lye made out of wood ashes is also used in the nixtamalization process of hominy corn by the tribes of the Eastern Woodlands in North America.

In the United States, food-grade lye must meet the requirements outlined in the Food Chemicals Codex (FCC), as prescribed by the U.S. Food and Drug Administration (FDA). Lower grades of lye that are unsuitable for use in food preparation are commonly used as drain de-cloggers and oven cleaners.

Soap 
Lye in the form of both sodium hydroxide and potassium hydroxide is used in making soap. Potassium hydroxide soaps are softer and more easily dissolved in water than sodium hydroxide soaps. Sodium hydroxide and potassium hydroxide are not interchangeable in either the proportions required or the properties produced in making soaps.

"Hot process" soap making also uses lye as the main ingredient. Lye is added to water, cooled for a few minutes and then added to oils and butters. The mixture is then cooked over a period of time (1–2 hours), typically in a slow cooker, and then placed into a mold.

Household 

Lyes are also valued for their cleaning effects. Sodium hydroxide is commonly the major constituent in commercial and industrial oven cleaners and clogged drain openers, due to its grease-dissolving abilities. Lyes decompose greases via alkaline ester hydrolysis, yielding water-soluble residues that are easily removed by rinsing.

Tissue digestion 
Sodium or potassium hydroxide can be used to digest tissues of animal carcasses. Often referred to as alkaline hydrolysis, the process involves placing the animal carcass into a sealed chamber, adding a mixture of lye and water and the application of heat to accelerate the process. After several hours the chamber will contain a liquid with coffee-like appearance, and the only solids that remain are very fragile bone hulls of mostly calcium phosphate, which can be mechanically crushed to a fine powder with very little force. Sodium hydroxide is frequently used in the process of decomposing roadkill dumped in landfills by animal disposal contractors. Due to its low cost and easy availability, it has also been used to dispose of corpses by criminals. Italian serial killer Leonarda Cianciulli used this chemical to turn dead bodies into soap. In Mexico, a man who worked for drug cartels admitted to having disposed of more than 300 bodies with it.

Fungus identification 

A 3–10% solution of potassium hydroxide (KOH) gives a color change in some species of mushrooms:
 In Agaricus, some species such as A. xanthodermus turn yellow with KOH, many have no reaction, and A. subrutilescens turns green.
 Distinctive change occurs for some species of Cortinarius and boletes

Safety

First aid 
Sources recommend immediate removal of contaminated clothing/materials, gently brushing/wiping excess off of skin, and then flushing the area of exposure with running water for 15–60 minutes while contacting emergency services.

Protection 
Personal protective equipment including safety glasses, chemical-resistant gloves, and adequate ventilation are required for the safe handling of lyes. When in proximity to a lye that is dissolving in an open container of water, the use of a vapor-resistant face mask is recommended. Adding lye to water too quickly can cause the solution to boil.

Storage 
Solid lyes are deliquescents and have a strong affinity for air moisture. Solid lyes will deliquesce or dissolve when exposed to open air, absorbing a relatively large amount of water vapour. Accordingly, lyes are stored in air-tight plastic containers. Glass is not a good material to be used for storage as lyes are mildly corrosive to it. Similar to the case of other corrosives, the containers should be labeled to indicate the potential danger of the contents and stored away from children, pets, heat, and moisture.

Hazardous reactions 
The majority of safety concerns with lye are also common with most corrosives, such as their potentially destructive effects on living tissues; examples are the skin, flesh, and the cornea. Solutions containing lyes can cause chemical burns, permanent injuries, scarring and blindness, immediately upon contact. Lyes may be harmful or even fatal if swallowed; ingestion can cause esophageal stricture. Moreover, the solvation of dry solid lyes is highly exothermic; the resulting heat may cause additional burns or ignite flammables.

The reaction between sodium hydroxide and a few metals is also hazardous. Aluminium reacts with lyes to produce hydrogen gas. Since hydrogen is flammable, mixing a large quantity of a lye such as sodium hydroxide with aluminium in a closed container is dangerous—especially when the system is at a high temperature, which speeds up the reaction. In addition to aluminium, lyes may also react with magnesium, zinc, tin, chromium, brass or bronze—producing hydrogen gas.  Both the potassium and sodium forms are able to dissolve copper.

See also 
 Slaked lime (calcium hydroxide)

References

Further reading

External links 
 
 

Hydroxides
Household chemicals
Deliquescent substances
Desiccants
Soaps
Sodium compounds